Yérétiélé is a village in northwestern Ivory Coast. It is in the sub-prefecture of Dianra, Dianra Department, Béré Region, Woroba District.

Yérétiélé was a commune until March 2012, when it became one of 1,126 communes nationwide that were abolished.

Notes

Former communes of Ivory Coast
Populated places in Woroba District
Populated places in Béré Region